The 2012 FINA Diving World Series was the 2012 edition of the FINA Diving World Series. The divers who participated were the current world and olympic champions and runners-up, the top 8 divers in the world rankings and along with some wild cards from either the host nation or from certain countries which had previously qualified athletes for the World Series. This World Series was made up by four legs hosted in different cities: 1st leg Dubai, United Arab Emirates; 2nd leg Beijing, China; 3rd leg Moscow, Russia; and 4th leg Tijuana, Mexico.

Overall medal tally

Dubai leg

Medal table

Medal summary

Men

Women

Beijing leg

Medal table

Medal summary

Men

Women

Moscow leg

Medal table

Medal summary

Men

Women

Tijuana leg

Medal table

Medal summary

Men

Women 

2012 in diving
FINA Diving World Series